Nicolaas Albertus Adrianus "Nico" Landeweerd (born April 3, 1954 in Hilversum) is a former water polo player from the Netherlands, who participated in three Summer Olympics. At his debut, at the 1976 Summer Olympics in Montreal, he won the bronze medal with the Dutch team. In 1980 and 1984 Landeweerd finished in sixth position with the Holland squad.

See also
 List of Olympic medalists in water polo (men)

External links
 

1954 births
Living people
Dutch male water polo players
Olympic bronze medalists for the Netherlands in water polo
Water polo players at the 1976 Summer Olympics
Water polo players at the 1980 Summer Olympics
Water polo players at the 1984 Summer Olympics
Sportspeople from Hilversum
Medalists at the 1976 Summer Olympics
20th-century Dutch people